The Museo Nazionale dell'Automobile (The National Automobile Museum), founded by Carlo Biscaretti di Ruffia, is an automobile museum in Turin, northern Italy.  The museum has a collection of almost 200 cars among eighty automobile brands representing eight countries (Italy, France, Great Britain, Germany, Netherlands, Spain, United States of America, Poland).
The museum is situated in a building dating from 1960, and it has three floors.
The museum also has its own library, documentation centre, bookshop and auditorium.

Collection
The museum's collection includes the first Italian cars, a Bernardi from 1896 and a Fiat from 1899, a Rolls-Royce Silver Ghost from 1914, and racing cars by Ferrari and Alfa Romeo. Also included are for instance an 1893 Benz Victoria, an 1894 Peugeot, a 1904 Oldsmobile, the 1907 Itala from the Peking to Paris race, a 1913 De Dion-Bouton, a 1916 Ford T and the 1929 Isotta Fraschini Tipo 8A that starred in Sunset Boulevard.

Documentation Centre

The Documentation Centre collects historical data sheets, photographs, documents, sales brochures, construction diagrams, and everything related to cars that they were able to collect over the years. The collection consists of photographs by tens of thousands of prints in black and white and it works in conjunction with the Ministry for Cultural Heritage.

Library
The museum's library holds about 7,000 texts, most of them out of print and hard to find. It is divided into seven sections (history of locomotion, history of brands, racing, technology, biographies, economy, and others). Most of the volumes date back to the first phases of the automotive industry, from the beginning until the 1950s.

References

External links

 

Automobile museums in Italy
Museums in Turin
Automobile
Museums established in 1960
1960 establishments in Italy